Zdeněk Baumruk is a Czechoslovak retired slalom canoeist who competed in the early 1960s. He won a silver medal in the C-2 team event at the 1961 ICF Canoe Slalom World Championships in Hainsberg.

References

Czechoslovak male canoeists
Possibly living people
Year of birth missing (living people)
Medalists at the ICF Canoe Slalom World Championships